Culgaith is a civil parish in the Eden District, Cumbria, England. It contains 23 buildings that are recorded in the National Heritage List for England. Of these, two are listed at Grade II*, the middle of the three grades, and the others are at Grade II, the lowest grade.  The parish contains the villages of Culgaith, Skirwith, and Kirkland and is otherwise rural.  The listed buildings consist of houses and associated structures, farmhouses, farm buildings, churches and items in the churchyards, a chapel, a war memorial, and three boundary stones. 


Key

Buildings

Notes and references

Notes

Citations

Sources

Lists of listed buildings in Cumbria